Iridium 77 is a communications Satellite which is part of a satellite constellation known as Iridium, named after the 77th chemical element of the periodic table, iridium. It was launched in 1998 and as of 2014, operational. It is owned and funded by Iridium, a communications company.

Network
Iridium 77 is a part of a space-based communications system called Iridium. Conceived, designed, and built by Motorola, the Iridium system provides wireless, mobile communications through a network of 66 satellites in polar, low-Earth orbits. Inaugurated in November 1998, under the auspices of Iridium LLC, this complex space system allowed callers using hand-held mobile phones and pagers to communicate anywhere in the world—a first in the history of telephony.

Overview

Launch
It was launched by Delta II 7920 from Vandenberg Air Force Base on 8 September 1998 at 21:13:00 UTC along  with four other satellites, all of which were Iridium satellites.

Features
Iridium 77 is 3-axis stabilized, with a hydrazine propulsion system. It has 2 solar panels with 1-axis articulation. The system employs L-Band using FDMA/TDMA to provide voice at 4.8 kbit/s and data at 2.4 kbit/s with 16 dB margin. The satellite has 48 spot beams for Earth coverage and uses Ka-Band for crosslinks and ground commanding.

See also

 1998 in spaceflight
 Iridium Communications
 Iridium satellite constellation

References

Satellites orbiting Earth
Spacecraft launched in 1998
Iridium satellites